The 2003–04 NC State Wolfpack men's basketball team represented North Carolina State University as a member of the Atlantic Coast Conference during the 2003–04 men's college basketball season. It was Herb Sendek's eighth season as head coach. The Wolfpack earned a bid to the NCAA tournament, reached the second round, and finished with a record of 21–10 (11–5 ACC).

Roster

Schedule and results

|-
!colspan=9 style=| Regular Season

|-
!colspan=9 style=| ACC Tournament

|-
!colspan=9 style=| NCAA Tournament

Rankings

References

NC State Wolfpack men's basketball seasons
Nc State
NC State Wolfpack men's basketball
NC State Wolfpack men's basketball
Nc State